Etuate Vakatawa is a Fijian rugby league footballer who represented Fiji in the 2000 Rugby League World Cup.

He played club football for the Tumbarumba Greens in the Group 9 Rugby League competition.

References

Living people
Fijian rugby league players
Fiji national rugby league team players
Rugby league props
Rugby league second-rows
I-Taukei Fijian people
Year of birth missing (living people)